Donkey Kong Country 3: Dixie Kong's Double Trouble! is a 1996 platform video game developed by Rare and published by Nintendo for the Super Nintendo Entertainment System (SNES). It was released in November 1996 in North America and Japan, and on 13 December in Europe and Australia. It is the third installment of the Donkey Kong Country series and serves as a direct sequel to Donkey Kong Country 2: Diddy's Kong Quest. It was also re-released for the Game Boy Advance (GBA) in 2005. The game was made available to download on the Wii's Virtual Console service in 2007, as well as for the Wii U's Virtual Console in 2014.

The plot centers on Dixie Kong and her cousin, Kiddy Kong, in their attempts to save the captured Donkey Kong and Diddy Kong from the series' antagonist King K. Rool. The game is set in the "Northern Kremisphere", a fictionalized version of northern Europe and Canada. Dixie Kong's Double Trouble! utilises the same Silicon Graphics technology from its predecessors, which features the use of pre-rendered 3D imagery. The game received positive reviews upon release; critics praised the visuals and various aspects of gameplay, but most were divided over the game's soundtrack.

Gameplay 

Dixie Kong's Double Trouble! is a platform game where players control Dixie Kong and her baby cousin, Kiddy Kong, through 8 worlds which comprise a total of 48 levels. Many of the gameplay elements from previous games in the series mark a return in this game, such as barrels, bonus levels which reward the player with special "bonus coins", DK coins, animal helpers and a multiplayer mode. Both of the two playable Kongs have unique abilities, such as Dixie's ability to slow her descent by spinning her ponytail, and Kiddy's ability to bounce across open water. The Kongs may also pick each other up to throw each other around levels; the impact of the other player-character can reveal cracked floors, hidden switches or secret areas. At any time, the player can switch Kongs during a level.

Levels in the game include a mixture of platforming, swimming and on-rails levels. They are based around several returning themes including forests, cliff-sides, factories and mountain tops. The level design is more diverse compared to its predecessors, which includes more complex puzzles and obstacles. Every level has an enemy called a Koin; each of these enemies bears the DK Coin of their respective level, holding it as a shield. As these enemies always face towards the player, they must be defeated by throwing a steel barrel over them so it bounces off a wall behind them in order to strike them from behind. The game overworld is also more complex, allowing players to explore between each area instead of forcing them along a linear path. To achieve this, the game includes several vehicles such as a speedboat and hovercraft which can be used to traverse the overworld and access different worlds.

The game features "animal friends", which return from its predecessors. Returning animals include Enguarde the swordfish, Squitter the spider and Squawks the parrot. New animals include Ellie the elephant, who can suck up water through her trunk to spray enemies with, and Parry the "parallel bird", who flies directly above the player-characters and can be used to collect out-of-reach items. As in the previous game, players can directly control animals instead of just riding them. Scattered around the Northern Kremisphere overworld are the Brothers Bear, a family of bears who provide the players with hints, key items or other services. Players can collect items in levels to trade with the bears for other items or to help progress to later levels; one such item is the Bear Coin, which acts as the game's currency. Other members from the Kong family, such as Wrinkly Kong, Swanky Kong, and Funky Kong, can also be found around the overworld, each of whom offer their own services.

Plot

Characters 

The player-characters in this game are Dixie Kong, who is Diddy Kong's girlfriend, and her younger cousin, Kiddy Kong. Scattered around the overworld are various other characters: Wrinkly Kong appears in "save caves", which when entered allow the player to save their game; Funky Kong plays a key role in the game, as he supplies the player with vehicles to traverse the overworld; Swanky Kong, reappearing from the previous game, allows players to challenge Cranky Kong in a contest involving throwing balls at targets in exchange for Bear Coins. New to the series are the Brothers Bear, thirteen bears providing the player with services in exchange for Bear Coins, some of who are instrumental for advancing through the game. The main antagonist of the previous games, King K. Rool, reappears under the moniker of "Baron K. Roolenstein".

Story 
Shortly after the events of Diddy's Kong Quest, Donkey Kong and Diddy Kong suddenly disappear in the Northern Kremisphere. Dixie Kong sets off to find the pair and is joined by her cousin Kiddy Kong and aided by Funky Kong's vehicles to traverse the land. They reach Kastle KAOS, the lair of a robot named KAOS, who was thought to be the new leader of the Kremlings. After they destroy KAOS, the curtain in the background rolls up to reveal the robot was being controlled by Baron K. Roolenstein, the new moniker of King K. Rool. After the duo fights him, Donkey and Diddy pop out of the destroyed KAOS, implying they were being used to power the robot.

Dixie and Kiddy uncover the extinct volcanic island of Krematoa. They meet Boomer, an exiled member of the Brothers Bear, inside his Anderson shelter. He agrees to destroy the rocks hindering the path in exchange for bonus coins. After Dixie and Kiddy find all bonus coins and five cogwheels hidden in Krematoa, the duo give the cogs to Boomer, who puts them into a machine which re-activates Krematoa, revealing the Knautilus, K. Roolenstein's personal submarine. The Kongs board the submarine and battle against him in there, but he escapes once again.

Once the Kongs collect all DK coins, they give the coins to Funky, who in exchange gives them a gyrocopter. The duo then finds an enigmatic creature called the Banana Bird Queen, who is bound to a barrier cast by K. Roolenstein. She tells the Kongs that she can only be freed if her separated children are returned to her, and that she will rid the land of K. Rool if she is freed. The Kongs find each of her children in a cave, where one of the birds is trapped in a crystal which shatters when the Kongs complete a Simon-like memory game. After rescuing them and completing a large trade sequence between the Brothers Bear, the Kongs return the children to the Queen. The Queen and her children all sing, annihilating the barrier. The Queen proceeds to chase K. Rool, who is fleeing in a hovercraft. When she catches up to him, she drops a giant eggshell on top of him, which Dixie and Kiddy land on. The Kongs repeatedly knock on the shell, annoying the captured K. Rool.

Development and release 
Development of Dixie Kong's Double Trouble! began shortly after the release of Diddy's Kong Quest, utilising the same Silicon Graphics (SGI) and Advanced Computer Modelling (ACM) rendering technology as its predecessors, in which pre-rendered 3D animations are turned into 2D sprites. Rare founder Tim Stamper re-took the role as the game's director, whereas Rare staffers Andrew Collard and Paul Weaver designed the game. The game's soundtrack was composed by Eveline Fischer, with additional tracks by series composer David Wise, and Fischer producing most of the game's music.

Dixie Kong's Double Trouble! was first released in North America on 18 November 1996 and Europe and Australia on 13 December. It was also made available to download on the Wii's Virtual Console service in 2007, as well as for the Wii U's Virtual Console in 2014. It was later released on the Nintendo Switch via the Nintendo Switch Online service on 18 December 2020. While the game sold over 3.5 million units worldwide, it has been suggested that its sales were hurt by its November release, which was when Nintendo 64 console was popular after its September launch. 1.7 million copies were sold in Japan and 1.12 million copies sold in the United States.

A port was later released for the Game Boy Advance in November 2005, which includes a new soundtrack composed by Wise; the team originally had a "vague hope" to have both the original and the new soundtrack in that version, but this proved unfeasible due to cartridge and time constraints.
The game also included an unlockable Christmas theme for the bonus levels. By entering "Merry" on the file select screen, the stars and bananas will be changed to bells and presents and the background music will change to Christmas music.

Reception

The game received positive reviews upon release. The SNES version holds an aggregate score of 83% from GameRankings, whereas the Game Boy Advance version holds a score of 75%.

The graphics and gameplay were the most praised aspects of the game. Frank Provo of GameSpot stated that the graphics were colourful, vibrant and "top-notch". The four reviewers of Electronic Gaming Monthly found them colourful and even sharper than those of previous instalments. They said that the gameplay, while not differing much from the previous game, has ample intelligent design and replay value in the levels to make it a must-have for those who liked previous games in the series. A Next Generation critic argued that the game's perceived similarity to the first two games is to an extent superficial, noting its graphics as detailed and crispier than Donkey Kong Country 2, and its controls as refined, giving the movement and action to be more precise and intuitive. He also highly praised the level designs and balanced challenge. Doctor Devon of GamePro scored it a 4.5 out of 5 in sound and fun factor and a perfect 5.0 in graphics and control, describing the backgrounds as sharp and colorful, the underwater levels as suitable for framing, and characters displaying more details. He criticised it for largely repeating the gameplay of the previous instalments, but still found the game highly enjoyable. Lucas Thomas of IGN opined that Dixie Kong's Double Trouble!s visuals were not as awe-inspiring as the pre-rendered CGI of Donkey Kong Country, but admitted that they "still looked great" for the third instalment. In a retrospective review, Marcel van Duyn of NintendoLife praised the game's visuals and detailed backgrounds, stating that they were "fantastic" for the SNES. Reviewing the Game Boy Advance version, a reviewer from GamePro thought that the graphics appeared "washed out" on the system's backlit screen, stating that the pre-rendered sprites did not "show up very well". A reviewer from Nintendo Master thought that the game's main strengths were its beautiful graphics and script. A reviewer from Jeuxvideo asserted that the various aspects of gameplay made Dixie Kong's Double Trouble! a hallmark of the series.

The music received mixed opinions from critics. Doctor Devon commented that although it sounds similar to its predecessors, Dixie Kong's Double Trouble! has a music of superb quality. Thomas thought compared to the other Donkey Kong Country games, the music in Dixie Kong's Double Trouble! stands out the least, although he stated that it was an "impressive effort". Van Duyn similarly commented that the soundtrack was not as "legendary" as it was in its previous instalment, but still admitted that it had some "great" tracks. In addition, Van Duyn criticised the Game Boy Advance's port for replacing all of the original music with new compositions. Although Provo stated that the Game Boy Advance port's music was "catchy" and "just as good as the originals", he noted that devotees to the original SNES game may not like it.

Electronic Gaming Monthly editors named Donkey Kong Country 3 a runner-up for both Super NES Game of the Year (behind Tetris Attack) and Side-Scrolling Game of the Year (behind Guardian Heroes). In 2018, Complex listed the game number 65 in their The Best Super Nintendo Games of All Time. IGN ranked Donkey Kong Country 3 58th on their "Top 100 SNES Games of All Time" and describing the game as a satisfying conclusion to Rare's cycle of 16-bit platformers.

Notes

References

Bibliography

External links
Official website

1996 video games
2005 video games
Cooperative video games
Donkey Kong platform games
Donkey Kong Country
Game Boy Advance games
Rare (company) games
Super Nintendo Entertainment System games
Virtual Console games
Virtual Console games for Wii U
Video game sequels
Video games scored by Eveline Fischer Novakovic
Video games about children
Video games featuring female protagonists
Video games set on fictional islands
Video games with pre-rendered 3D graphics
Video games with digitized sprites
Multiplayer and single-player video games
Video games scored by David Wise
Christmas video games
Nintendo Switch Online games
Virtual Console games for Nintendo 3DS
Video games developed in the United Kingdom